Scoparia ingratella is a species of moth in the family Crambidae. It is found in most of Europe, except Ireland, Great Britain, the Benelux, Portugal, Fennoscandia, the Baltic region and Ukraine.

The wingspan is 20–25 mm. Adults are on wing from May to late July in one generation per year.

References

Moths described in 1846
Scorparia
Moths of Europe
Moths of Asia